Santa Inés is a Spanish town and municipality in the province of Burgos, part of the autonomous community of Castile and León (Spain).

Municipalities in the Province of Burgos